Adolphus Lake is a lake in Alberta, Canada on the border of Jasper National Park and Mount Robson Provincial Park.

Adolphus Lake was named after Adolphus Moberly, an early metis in the Jasper area with close links to the local Iroquois. He guided the Arthur Coleman 1908 expedition from Jasper valley up the Moose River, to Moose Pass. The expedition continued into the headwaters of the Smoky River, and over Robson Pass to the foot of Robson Glacier.

See also
List of lakes of Alberta

References

Lakes of Alberta